Charlotte Square is a garden square in Edinburgh, Scotland, part of the New Town, designated a UNESCO World Heritage Site. The square is located at the west end of George Street and was intended to mirror St. Andrew Square in the east. The gardens, one of the collection of New Town Gardens, are private and not publicly accessible.

History
Initially named St. George's Square in James Craig's original plan, it was renamed in 1786 after King George III's Queen and first daughter, to avoid confusion with George Square to the south of the Old Town. Charlotte Square was the last part of the initial phase of the New Town to be "completed" in 1820 (note- the north-west section at Glenfinlas Street was not completed until 1990 due to a long-running boundary dispute). Much of it was to the 1791 design of Robert Adam, who died in 1792, just as building began.

In 1939 a very sizable air-raid shelter was created under the south side of the gardens, accessed from the street to the south.

In 2013 the south side was redeveloped in an award-winning scheme by Paul Quinn, creating major new office floorspace behind a restored series of townhouses.

Edinburgh Collegiate School was located in Charlotte Square.

Gardens
The garden was originally laid out as a level circular form by William Weir in 1808.

In 1861 a plan was drawn up by Robert Matheson, Clerk of Works for Scotland for a larger, more square garden, centred upon a memorial to the recently deceased Prince Albert, the consort of Queen Victoria.

The commission for the sculpture was granted in 1865 to Sir John Steell. The main statue features an equestrian statue of the prince, in field marshal's uniform, dwarfing the four figures around the base. It was unveiled by Queen Victoria herself in 1876. The stone plinth was designed by the architect David Bryce and the four corner figures are by David Watson Stevenson (Science and Learning/Labour), George Clark Stanton (Army and Navy) and William Brodie (Nobility). The statue was originally intended to go in the centre of the eastern edge of the garden, facing down George Street.

This remodelling featured major new tree-planting which took many years to re-establish.

The central open space is a private garden, available to owners of the surrounding properties. For the last three weeks in August each year Charlotte Square gardens are the site of the Edinburgh International Book Festival.

The railings around the gardens were removed in 1940 as part of the war effort. The current railings date from 1947.

Buildings
On the north side, No. 5 was the home of John Crichton-Stuart, 4th Marquess of Bute (1881–1947), who bought it in 1903 and gave it to the National Trust for Scotland on his death. It was the Trust headquarters from 1949 to 2000. Bute did much to promote the preservation of the square.

Nos. 6 and 7 are also owned by the National Trust for Scotland. No.6, Bute House is the official residence of the First Minister of Scotland. In 1806 it was home to Sir John Sinclair creator of the first Statistical Account of Scotland. No. 7 was internally restored by the Trust in 1975 to its original state, and is open to the public as The Georgian House. The upper floor was formerly the official residence of the Moderator of the General Assembly of the Church of Scotland. The building includes one fireplace brought from Hill of Tarvit in Fife in 1975.

West Register House, formerly St. George's Church, forms the centre of the west side. It was designed by the architect Robert Reid in 1811, broadly to Adam's plan. The church opened in 1814 and was converted to its current use in 1964. It is one of the main buildings of the National Records of Scotland

Residents
From the very inception of Charlotte Square in 1791, it was anticipated it would be one of the top addresses in Edinburgh. As the Victorian era commenced, the square was increasingly occupied by the elite of the middle class: legal and medical professionals. This is reflected in the notable residents listed below. As the 20th century began most buildings were still occupied as residential addresses, although more are offices, solely occupied by guardians.

Pioneer of the telephone, Alexander Graham Bell, was born in nearby South Charlotte Street.

References

1820 establishments in the United Kingdom
Category A listed buildings in Edinburgh
New Town, Edinburgh
Squares in Edinburgh